The Diamond Bandit is a 1924 American silent Western film directed by Francis Ford and starring Ashton Dearholt, Florence Gilbert and Frank Baker.

Synopsis
In South America mountain villagers are oppressed by a local commander. In response one of the locals takes up arms against him.

Cast
 Ashton Dearholt as Pinto Pete
 Arthur George as Father Cantos
 Florence Gilbert as The Mission Waif
 Frank Baker as Jaspaz Lorenzo
 Robert F. McGowan as Lorenzo's Lieutenant
 Harry Dunkinson as Friar Michael
 Francis Ford as Friar Aloysius

References

External links
 

1924 films
1924 Western (genre) films
Films directed by Francis Ford
Arrow Film Corporation films
Silent American Western (genre) films
1920s English-language films
1920s American films